The 2009–10 Xavier Musketeers men's basketball team represented Xavier University in the 2009–10 college basketball season. This was head coach Chris Mack's first season at Xavier. The Musketeers competed in the Atlantic 10 Conference and played their home games at the Cintas Center. Xavier finished the season with a record of 26–9; 14–2 in A-10 play to capture a share of the regular season championship with Temple. The Musketeers lost in the semifinals of the 2010 Atlantic 10 men's basketball tournament to Richmond. Xavier received an at-large bid to the NCAA tournament, as a #6 seed. They defeated Minnesota and Pittsburgh to advance to the Sweet Sixteen. In the Sweet Sixteen, they fell to Kansas State in double overtime.

Previous season
The Musketeers finished the 2008–09 season with a record of 26–9, 14–2 win the A-10 regular season championship. The Musketeers lost to Saint Joseph's in the A-10 tournament. Xavier received a #4 seed in the NCAA tournament where they advanced to the Sweet Sixteen before losing to Pittsburgh.

Roster
Source

Schedule and results

|-
!colspan=9 style=| Exhibition

|-
!colspan=9 style=| Regular season

|-
!colspan=9 style=| Atlantic 10 tournament

|-
!colspan=9 style=|NCAA tournament

References

Xavier
Xavier
Xavier Musketeers men's basketball seasons